The Holly Springs School District is a public school district based in Holly Springs, Mississippi (USA).

Schools
Holly Springs High School (Grades 9-12)
Holly Springs Junior High School (Grades 7-8)
Holly Springs Intermediate School (Grades 4-6)
Holly Springs Primary School (Grades PK-3)

Demographics

2006–2007 school year

There were a total of 1,985 students enrolled in the Holly Springs School District during the 2006–2007 school year. The gender makeup of the district was 50% female and 50% male. The racial makeup of the district was 97.76% African American, 1.74% White, 0.45% Hispanic, and 0.06% Asian. 77.2% of the district's students were eligible to receive free lunch.

Previous school years

Accountability statistics

See also
List of school districts in Mississippi

References

External links
 

Education in Marshall County, Mississippi
School districts in Mississippi